For the 1962 FIFA World Cup qualification, there were three inter-confederation play-offs to determine the final three qualification spots to the 1962 FIFA World Cup. The matches were played between 8 October – 26 November 1961.

Format
The six teams from the five confederations (AFC, CAF, CONMEBOL, NAFC, and UEFA) were drawn into three ties.

In each tie, the two teams played a two-legged home-and-away series. The three winners, decided on aggregate score, qualified for the 1962 FIFA World Cup in Chile.

Qualified teams

Matches
The matches were played between 8 October – 26 November 1961.

CAF v UEFA

UEFA v AFC

CCCF/NAFC v CONMEBOL

Goalscorers
There were 17 goals scored in 6 matches, for an average of 2.83 goals per match.

3 goals
 Milan Galić

2 goals
 Dragoslav Šekularac

1 goal

 Salvador Reyes
 Abdallah Ben Barek
 Mohamed Riahi
 Chung Soon-cheon
 Yoo Pan-soon
 Enrique Collar
 Alfredo Di Stéfano
 Marcelino
 Luis del Sol
 Zvezdan Čebinac
 Dražan Jerković
 Petar Radaković

References

Play-off